Smoking and infertility may refer to:
Smoking and female infertility
Smoking and male infertility